Villa de Pomán is a town and municipality in Catamarca Province in northwestern Argentina.

It has 2,259 inhabitants (INDEC, 2001), representing an increase of 43.24% compared with 1,577 inhabitants (INDEC, 1991) the previous census.

References

Populated places in Catamarca Province